Julien Pierre Poueys (born 27 July 1979) is a French football manager and former player who played as forward. As of the 2021–22 season, he is the head coach of Départemental 1 club Paulhan.

References

External links

1979 births
Living people
French footballers
Montpellier HSC players
UE Lleida players
FC Sion players
CS Sedan Ardennes players
AS Beauvais Oise players
Gazélec Ajaccio players
UD Las Palmas players
Pau FC players
FC Chartres players
Trélissac FC players
Genêts Anglet players
Aviron Bayonnais FC players
ES Paulhan-Pézenas players
Canet Roussillon FC players
Association football forwards
French football managers
Association football player-managers